Marc Jaeger (born 1954) is a jurist from Luxembourg, and a judge at the General Court of the EU. He was appointed in 1996. In 2007, he became President of the court.

He studied law at the University of Strasbourg and the College of Europe (1979-1980 promotion).

References 

1954 births
Living people
College of Europe alumni
University of Strasbourg alumni
General Court (European Union) judges
Presidents of the General Court (European Union)
Luxembourgian judges of international courts and tribunals
Luxembourgian officials of the European Union